Mouse Trap is a maze video game developed by Exidy and released in arcades in 1981. It is similar to Pac-Man, with the main character replaced by a mouse, the dots with cheese, the ghosts with cats, and the energizers with bones. After collecting a bone, pressing a button turns the mouse into a dog for a brief period of time. Color-coded doors in the maze can be toggled by pressing a button of the same color. A hawk periodically flies across the maze, unrestricted by its walls.

Coleco ported Mouse Trap to ColecoVision as a 1982 launch title, then later to the Intellivision and Atari 2600.

Gameplay

The player uses a four-position joystick to maneuver a mouse throughout a maze and eat pieces of cheese scattered along the paths. Six cats patrol the maze and chase the player, with two present at the outset and four more being released one at a time. The maze has three sets of color-coded doors, which the player can open or close by pressing the corresponding buttons in order to block the cats' approach. The player can also escape the cats by entering the "IN" box at the center of the screen, which will teleport the mouse to one of the four corners at random. Contact between the mouse and a cat costs the player one life.

The player can pick up bones from the corners of the maze, then use them later by pressing a fourth button. Doing so turns the mouse into a dog for a short time, during which it can eat the cats for bonus points and temporarily remove them from the maze. However, the cats will move at a faster speed when they re-spawn into the maze. Unused bones carry over from one level to the next and from one life to the next.

At times, a hawk will fly through the maze, trying to catch the player. The hawk can eat both the mouse and the dog, costing the player one life, and it can fly over the walls. It can only be foiled by using the "IN" box, which causes it to fly randomly and then leave the maze.

At any given time, a bonus object is present in the maze and can be eaten for points, causing a more valuable object to appear elsewhere. The bonus sequence restarts when the player either loses a life or eats the most valuable object in the sequence. When all of the cheese has been eaten, the player earns a bonus and moves to the next level.

Ports
Coleco ported Mouse Trap to its own ColecoVision console, with 15 prizes instead of 32, an option to leave the hawk out, and different sound effects. Coleco's Intellivision port adds an audio warning when a cat is about to enter the maze. The score differs: cheese is worth 
90 points and, cats are worth 100, 300, 500, 700, 900 and 1100 points.

Coleco also ported Mouse Trap to the Atari 2600, simplifying graphics and gameplay. The maze is more squat with brighter walls, and doors form a single-colored set that flickers. Gameplay basics are the same, but the hawk, the "IN" area, and the bonus prizes are missing, there are three cats instead of six, and all doors move at once. Additionally, pressing the single joystick button will switch the doors' positions or activate a stored bone, depending on if the player does a long press or a quick tap. Scoring is also reduced significantly: cheese is worth 1 point instead of 10 points, cats are worth 10 points and do not increase in value, and clearing a maze awards only 100 points.

Reception
According to Electronic Games in 1983, Mouse Trap was unsuccessful because arcade owners viewed it "as basically another maze game."

Legacy
In 1982, Buckner & Garcia recorded the song "Mousetrap" using sound effects from the game and released it on the album Pac-Man Fever. When they re-recorded the album in 1999, they were unable to find a machine and instead used dog and cat sounds recorded in a pet store.

See also
Lady Bug
Lock 'n' Chase

References

External links 
 Mouse Trap at Giant Bomb
 Mouse Trap at Killer List of Videogames

1981 video games
Arcade video games
Atari 2600 games
ColecoVision games
Exidy games
Intellivision games
Pac-Man clones
Video games about cats
Video games about food and drink
Video games about mice and rats
Video games developed in the United States